Lamar Potter was a professional baseball pitcher in the Negro leagues. He played with the Atlanta Black Crackers in 1932.

References

External links
 and Seamheads

Atlanta Black Crackers players
Year of birth missing
Year of death missing
Baseball pitchers